Heron Pond – Little Black Slough Nature Preserve is a parcel of protected wetland property located approximately 5 miles (8 km) southwest of Vienna in Johnson County, Illinois.  It was designated a National Natural Landmark in 1972.  As part of the Cache River basin, it is classified as a wetland of international importance under the Ramsar Convention.

Biological history
The Heron Pond – Little Black Slough Nature Preserve protects a swath of Cache River drainage upstream from the Post Creek Cutoff.  It combines upland limestone bluffs (Wildcat Bluff), Cache River floodplain, and a drier mesic woodland (Boss Island).

The wetland sections of this Nature Preserve protect several old growths of bald cypress and water tupelo.  A heron rookery has been logged here.

The Wildcat Bluff upland may commemorate one of the nature preserve's top carnivores, the bobcat.  There are also river otters here. Birdwatchers come to Heron Pond - Little Black Slough to search for a variety of raptors, including the black vulture, red-shouldered hawk, and the barred owl, and enjoy a variety of songbirds, including the Kentucky warbler and the yellow-throated warbler.

Today
The Heron Pond – Little Black Slough Nature Preserve complex comprises 1,861 acres (753 hectares) of land accessible from U.S. Highway 45.  It is, in terms of area, the largest natural area owned and operated by the Illinois Department of Natural Resources.

The name of the small nearby town of Cypress, Illinois, appears to commemorate the cypress trees of the upper Cache River drainage, including the groves now protected within the Heron Pond – Little Black Slough Nature Preserve.

References

External links

Heron Pond-Little Black Slough Natural Area - Illinois Department of Natural Resources

Protected areas of Johnson County, Illinois
National Natural Landmarks in Illinois
Wetlands of Illinois
Nature reserves in Illinois
Landforms of Johnson County, Illinois
Ramsar sites in the United States